Senator Jennings may refer to:

David V. Jennings (1887–1970), Wisconsin State Senate
David Jennings (congressman) (1787–1834), Ohio State Senate
J. B. Jennings (born 1974), Maryland State Senate
Kit Jennings (born 1952), Wyoming State Senate
Timothy Jennings (born 1950), New Mexico State Senate
Toni Jennings (born 1949), Florida State Senate